The coxed pair was a rowing event held at the Summer Olympics. The event was first held for men at the second modern Olympics in 1900. It was not held in 1904, 1908, or 1912. It returned after World War I and was held from 1920 until it was removed from the programme following the 1992 Games, at which point it and the men's coxed four were replaced with the men's lightweight double sculls and men's lightweight coxless four. When women's rowing was added in 1976, only 6 of the 8 men's events had a women's equivalent; the coxed pair and the coxless four were the ones omitted. The coxed pair has never had a women's competition at the Olympics.

Medalists

Men

Multiple medalists

Medalists by country

References

Coxed pair